Chen Lin is a former female Chinese diver specializing in 10 metre platform event.  She was the gold medalist at 1986 World Championships in Madrid, Spain, and became the first Chinese world champion in diving.   Since retiring from a diver in 1990s, she has been working as a coach. In Beijing, she trained divers such as Li Na. She is currently a coach of Crystal Palace Diving in London.

References

Living people
Sportspeople from Beijing
Chinese female divers
World Aquatics Championships medalists in diving
Place of birth missing (living people)
Year of birth missing (living people)